GRAIN is a small international non-profit organisation that works to support small farmers and social movements in their struggles for community-controlled and biodiversity-based food systems.

GRAIN's work goes back to the early 1980s, when a number of activists around the world started drawing attention to the dramatic loss of genetic diversity on our farms — the very cornerstone of the world's food supply.

GRAIN began doing research, advocacy and lobbying work under the auspices of a coalition of mostly European development organisations. That work soon expanded into a larger program and network that needed its own footing. In 1990, GRAIN was legally established as an independent non-profit foundation with its headquarters in Barcelona, Spain.

By the mid-1990s, GRAIN reached an important turning point. They realized that they needed to connect more with the real alternatives that were being developed on the ground, in the South. Around the world, and at local level, many groups had begun rescuing local seeds and traditional knowledge and building and defending sustainable biodiversity-based food systems under the control of local communities, while turning their backs on the laboratory developed 'solutions' that had only got farmers into deeper trouble. In a radical organisational shift, GRAIN embarked on a decentralization process that brought them into closer contact with realities on the ground in the South, and into direct collaboration with partners working at that level. At the same time, they brought a number of those partners into their governing body and started regionalizing their staff pool.

In 2011, the organisation received the Right Livelihood Award "for their worldwide work to protect the livelihoods and rights of farming communities and to expose the massive purchases of farmland in developing countries by foreign financial interests."

References

External links
 Official website

International organisations based in Spain
Rural community development
Organizations established in the 1980s